The Institute for Systems and Computer Engineering, Technology and Science (INESC TEC) is a research & development institute located on the campus of the Faculty of Engineering of the University of Porto (Portugal). INESC TEC is a private non-profit association, recognised as a Public Interest Institution and has been an Associate Laboratory since 2002.

The purpose of INESC TEC is to act as an interface between the academic world, the world of industry and services and the public administration in Information Technologies, Telecommunications and Electronics (ITT&E). INESC TEC invests in Scientific Research and Technological Development, as well as in Advanced Training and Consulting, Technology Transfer and supports the Establishment of new Technology-based Companies.

Present in 6 sites in the cities of Porto, Braga and Vila Real, INESC TEC incorporates 13 R&D Centres and one Associate Unit with complementary competences, always looking to the international market. INESC TEC brings together more than 700 researchers, of which around 350 have PhDs.

History 
INESC was founded in the city of Porto in 1985, and in December 1998 it became INESC Porto, a branch of INESC. Following a rebranding process, the institution changed its name to INESC TEC, with INESC, the University of Porto Foundation  and the Polytechnic Institute of Porto.

In 2012, INESC TEC signed a protocol with the University of Minho. INESC TEC's complex in Minho is called HASLab – High Assurance Software Laboratory. In 2012, the University of Trás-os-Montes e Alto Douro (UTAD) also became a privileged partner of INESC TEC.

With the launching of INESC P&D Brasil (in São Paulo, Brazil), INESC TEC has strengthened its presence worldwide, always associating Portugal to international scientific excellence.

Research areas 
INESC TEC is one of Portugal's most influential research institutes with developments in areas such as health, renewable energies, enterprise systems, artificial intelligence, robotics, applied photonics, information systems  and high-assurance software.

In 2011, the Portuguese Navy joined efforts with the institute to develop technology for deep sea research and surveillance in order to monitor Portugal's Exclusive Economic Zone.

Among the people who work at INESC TEC are some of the most influential researchers both in Portugal and worldwide, such as José Carlos Príncipe, who won the 2011 IEEE Neural Networks Pioneer Award. In 2013, Vladimiro Miranda was awarded with the IEEE Power & Energy Society Ramakumar Family Renewable Energy Excellence Award 2012 by the prestigious Institute of Electrical and Electronics Engineers.

In December 2012, INESC TEC presented the Laboratory of Smart Grids and Electric Vehicles, which was the result of project REIVE (Smart Grids with Electric Vehicles). This is an unparallel infrastructure in the world and places Portugal at the forefront of smart grids worldwide. Provided with an experimental component that is unique, this laboratory makes it possible to test, in an environment that is very close to a real environment, new solutions that integrate microgeneration units and electric vehicles in Low Voltage grids.

INESC TEC conducts research in the following clusters:

 Power and Energy
 Computer Science
 Industry and Innovation
 Networked Intelligent Systems

Organisation 
The institute consists of:

13 R&D Centres
 CPES – Centre for Power and Energy Systems 
 CTM – Centre for Telecommunications and Multimedia 
 CAP – Centre for Applied Photonics
 CESE – Centre for Enterprise Systems Engineering
 CSIG – Centre for Information Systems and Computer Graphics
 CRIIS – Centre for Robotics in Industry and Intelligent Systems
 CRAS - Centre for Robotics and Autonomous Systems
 CITE – Centre for Innovation, Technology and Entrepreneurship
 C-BER - Centre for Biomedical Engineering Research
 LIAAD – Laboratory of Artificial Intelligence and Decision Support 
 CRACS – Centre for Research in Advanced Computing Systems
 CEGI – Centre for Industrial Engineering and Management
 HASLab – High-Assurance Software Laboratory

and 1 Associate R&D Unit

 CISTER - Research Centre in Real-Time and Embedded Computing Systems

Chairman of INESC TEC: José Manuel Mendonça 

President of the Scientific Council: Manuel António Matos 

President of the Scientific Advisory Board: José Carlos Príncipe (University of Florida, USA)

References

External links 
 INESC TEC
 FEUP
 University of Porto
 University of Minho

Research institutes in Portugal